The Mexibús Line I is a bus rapid transit (BRT) line in the Mexibús system. It operates between Felipe Ángeles International Airport in Zumpango, Ojo de Agua in Tecámac and Ciudad Azteca in Ecatepec de Morelos. It was the first line to be built and to be opened. It was inaugurated by the governor of the State of Mexico, Enrique Peña Nieto on 1 December 2010 with 24 stations. Another station was opened later. The line has four different types of services, including a service exclusive for women and children. The line operates with 75articulated Volvo 7300 BRT buses painted white with red, light green and dark green trim. It began free operations in October 2010.

Stations
There are three variations of this route:
 TR-1 Ojo de Agua–Ciudad Azteca regular service
 TR-3 Ojo de Agua–Ciudad Azteca express service (women-and-children-only service available)
 TR-4 Central de Abastos–Ciudad Azteca express service
 TR-5 Ojo de Agua–Terminal de Pasajeros regular service

{| width="80%"  class="wikitable"
! colspan="2" align="center" width="30%"| Station
!align="center"|TR-1
!align="center"|TR-3
!align="center"|TR-4
!align="center"|TR-5
! align="center"| Location
! align="center"| Connection
! align="center"| Picture
! align="center"| Opened
|-
| rowspan="33" width="2%" bgcolor="#cccccc" |
|  Ciudad Azteca
|align="center"|●
|align="center"|●
|align="center"|●
|align="center"|
| rowspan="23" | Ecatepec de Morelos
|
 Ciudad Azteca
  Line B: Ciudad Azteca station
| 
| rowspan="18" | 1 December 2010
|-
|  Quinto Sol
|align="center"|●
|align="center"|
|align="center"|
|align="center"|
| rowspan="10"|
|
|-
|  Josefa Ortíz de Domínguez
|align="center"|●
|align="center"|
|align="center"|
|align="center"|
|
|-
|  Industrial
|align="center"|●
|align="center"|
|align="center"|
|align="center"|
|
|-
|  UNITEC
|align="center"|●
|align="center"|●
|align="center"|●
|align="center"|
|
|-
|  Alfredo Torres
|align="center"|●
|align="center"|
|align="center"|
|align="center"|
| 
|-
|  Zodiaco
|align="center"|●
|align="center"|
|align="center"|
|align="center"|
| 
|-
|  Adolfo López Mateos
|align="center"|●
|align="center"|
|align="center"|
|align="center"|
|
|-
|  Vocacional 3
|align="center"|●
|align="center"|●
|align="center"|●
|align="center"|
|
|-
|  Valle Ecatepec
|align="center"|●
|align="center"|
|align="center"|
|align="center"|
|
|-
|  Las Américas
|align="center"|●
|align="center"|
|align="center"|
|align="center"|
| 
|-
|  1° de Mayo
|align="center"|●
|align="center"|●
|align="center"|●
|align="center"|
|
  Line II: Las Américas station
 1° de Mayo
| 
|-
|  Hospital
|align="center"|●
|align="center"|●
|align="center"|●
|align="center"|
| rowspan="2"|
| 
|-
|  Aquiles Serdán
|align="center"|●
|align="center"|
|align="center"|
|align="center"|
| 
|-
|  Jardines de Morelos
|align="center"|●
|align="center"|●
|align="center"|●
|align="center"|
|  Jardines de Morelos
| 
|-
|  Palomas
|align="center"|●
|align="center"|
|align="center"|
|align="center"|
| rowspan="2"|
|
|-
|  19 de septiembre
|align="center"|●
|align="center"|
|align="center"|
|align="center"|
|
|-
|  Central de Abastos
|align="center"|●
|align="center"|●
|align="center"|●
|align="center"|
|
  Line IV: Central de Abastos station
 Central de Abastos
|-
|  Insurgentes
|align="center"|●
|align="center"|
|align="center"|
|align="center"|
| rowspan="5"|
|
| Between 2015 and 2018
|-
|  Hidalgo
|align="center"|●
|align="center"|
|align="center"|
|align="center"|
|
| rowspan="5" | 1 December 2010
|-
|  Cuauhtémoc Sur
|align="center"|●
|align="center"|
|align="center"|
|align="center"|
| 
|-
|  Cuauhtémoc Norte
|align="center"|●
|align="center"|●
|align="center"|
|align="center"|
|
|-
|  Esmeralda
|align="center"|●
|align="center"|
|align="center"|
|
|-
|  Ojo de Agua
|align="center"|●
|align="center"|●
|align="center"|
|align="center"|●
| rowspan="6" | Tecámac
|
 Ojo de Agua
| 
|-
|  Loma Bonita
|align="center"|
|align="center"|
|align="center"|
|align="center"|●
| rowspan="8" |
|
| rowspan="3" | 21 March 2022
|-
|  Ozumbilla
|align="center"|
|align="center"|
|align="center"|
|align="center"|●
|
|-
|  San Francisco
|align="center"|
|align="center"|
|align="center"|
|align="center"|●
|
|-
| Hueyotenco
|align="center"|
|align="center"|
|align="center"|
|align="center"|●
|
| Under construction
|-
|  Tecámac
|align="center"|
|align="center"|
|align="center"|
|align="center"|●
|
| rowspan="5" | 21 March 2022
|-
|  Glorieta Militar
|align="center"|
|align="center"|
|align="center"|
|align="center"|●
| rowspan="4" | Zumpango
|
|-
|  Combustibles
|align="center"|
|align="center"|
|align="center"|
|align="center"|●
|
|-
|  Hacienda
|align="center"|
|align="center"|
|align="center"|
|align="center"|●
|
|-
|  Terminal de Pasajeros
|align="center"|
|align="center"|
|align="center"|
|align="center"|●
|
  Felipe Ángeles International Airport
  Line 1: Terminal AIFA
|}

Former stations
 Las Torres Santa María Chiconautla station was closed and totally dismantled in 2022. The station opened in 2010 and served the town of Santa María Chiconautla. To facilitate the operation of Lines I and IV, it was decided to open the then-inoperative Insurgentes station instead.

Incidents
On 29 May 2021, at 6:00 hours, a driver crashed into the turnstiles of UNITEC station. No riders resulted injured and the driver and their passengers ran away.

Notes

References

External links
 

2010 establishments in Mexico
1